René Marie Alphonse Charles Capitant (19 August 1901 in La Tronche, Isère – 23 May 1970 in Suresnes) was a French lawyer and politician.

He was the son of a lawyer, Henri Capitant, and attended the Lycée Henri-IV in Paris. He received his Juris Doctor degree also in Paris.

In 1930, he was appointed to the faculty of the University of Strasbourg and became a member of the Comité de vigilance des intellectuels antifascistes, an anti-fascist organization of intellectuals.

During World War II, he was involved in the creation of the resistance movement Combat in Clermont-Ferrand. He had to leave the country and became a law professor at the University of Algiers in 1941. After the Liberation, he became the Minister of Public Education in the provisional government.

From 1945 to 1951, he was a leftist Gaullist member of the National Assembly of France. In 1946, he founded, with Louis Vallon, the Union gaulliste.

After 1951, he was a law professor in Paris and was named director of the Franco-Japanese House in Tokyo from 1957 to 1960. He was then re-elected to the National Assembly from 1962 to 1968.

He served as the Minister of Justice (Garde des Sceaux) in the Georges Pompidou and Couve de Murville governments from 1968 to 1969.

References
French Wikipedia article on René Capitant

1901 births
1970 deaths
People from La Tronche
Politicians from Auvergne-Rhône-Alpes
Democratic and Socialist Union of the Resistance politicians
Rally of the French People politicians
Democratic Union of Labour politicians
Union of Democrats for the Republic politicians
French Ministers of Justice
French Ministers of National Education
Members of the Constituent Assembly of France (1945)
Deputies of the 1st National Assembly of the French Fourth Republic
Deputies of the 2nd National Assembly of the French Fifth Republic
Deputies of the 3rd National Assembly of the French Fifth Republic
Deputies of the 4th National Assembly of the French Fifth Republic
20th-century French lawyers
Lycée Henri-IV alumni
Academic staff of the University of Strasbourg
Academic staff of the University of Algiers
Burials at Montparnasse Cemetery